
Respite care is planned or emergency temporary care provided to caregivers of a child or adult.

Respite programs provide planned short-term and time-limited breaks for families and other unpaid caregivers of children with a developmental delay or behavioral problems, and adults with an intellectual disability or cognitive loss in order to support and maintain the primary caregiving relationship. Respite also provides a positive experience for the person receiving care. The term "short break" is used in some countries to describe respite care.

Even though many families take great joy in providing care to their loved ones so that they can remain at home, the physical, emotional and financial consequences for the family caregiver can be overwhelming without some support, such as respite. Respite provides a break for the family caregiver, which may prove beneficial to their health. Sixty percent of family caregivers age 19 to 64 recently surveyed by the Commonwealth Fund reported fair or poor health, one or more chronic conditions, or a disability, compared with only 33% of non-caregivers.

Respite has been shown to help sustain family caregiver health and wellness, avoid or delay out-of-home placements, and reduce the likelihood of abuse and neglect. An outcome-based evaluation pilot study showed that respite may also reduce the likelihood of divorce and help sustain marriages.

Respite care or respite services are also a family support service, and in the US is a long-term services and support (LTSS) as described by the Consortium of Citizens with Disabilities in Washington, D.C. as of 2013.

Rud Turnbull (Dr. Rutherford H. Turnbull III), himself a father of a young boy and co-director of the Beach Center on Families and Disability, completed one of the first law reviews of respite and family support in the 1990-1991 University of Kansas Law Review titled: "A Policy Analysis of Family Support for Families with Members with Disabilities".

There are many organisations in the UK and worldwide that help and support with respite care.

Models for respite care
There are various models for providing respite care.

In-home respite
In-home care is popular for obvious reasons. The temporary caregiver comes to the patient's home and gets to know the patient in his or her normal environment. The temporary caregiver learns the family routine, where medicines are stored, and the patient is not inconvenienced by transportation and strange environments. This model may involve friends, relatives and paid professionals. In the US, depending on the state, Medicaid or Medicare may be used to help cover costs.

Respite (In-Home) Services means intermittent or regularly scheduled temporary non-medical care (which can be healthcare financed) and/or in-home supervision. In-Home Respite support typically includes:

 Assisting the family members to enable a person with developmental disabilities to stay home
 Providing appropriate care and supervision to protect that person's safety in the absence of a family member
 Relieving family members from the constantly demanding responsibility of providing care
 Attending to basic self-help needs and other activities that would ordinarily be performed by the family member

Respite (out-of-home) services
Respite services are provided in the community at diverse sites, and by service providers which operate licensed residential facilities or bill under a category called respite.

Respite services typically are obtained from a respite vendor, by use of vouchers and/or alternative respite options. Vouchers are a means by which a family may choose their own service provider directly through a payment, coupon or other type of authorization.

Respite and community
Respite is an early service from the 1950s in which parents sought funding from the government for payments for specialized child care, called respite provided by the parent organizations themselves. Professional models of respite developed in the 1970s included community recreation options for the adults (e.g., at Ys, neighborhood centers, run and walks) as the parents had a "respite" or break from care giving (Racino, 2000). The state of New York has over 950 service providers in intellectual disabilities alone as of the mid-2000s (Castellani, 2005).

Group homes and respite
Many parents wished to have a designated facility to drop off their child for "respite" (e.g., weekend), which in institutional days is a role state governments played before it was recognized that the child had rights of their own. States did fund and develop community respite centers (small homes), and also designate places in group homes for respite, including innovative friends of the home in conjunction with the private, non-profit sector.

Specialized facility
Another model uses a specialized, local facility where the care receiver may stay for a few days or a few weeks. The advantage of this model is that the specialized facility will probably have better access to emergency facilities and professional assistance if needed.

Emergency respite
There may be the need for respite care on an emergency basis. When using "planned" emergency care, the caregiver has already identified a provider or facility to call in an emergency. Many homecare agencies, adult daycare, health centers, and residential care facilities provide emergency respite care.

Sitter-companion services
Sitter-companion services are one of about 6 different innovative community approaches or models to respite care which were developed internationally. They are all paid services in the US, which are only available to designated "clients" of the service systems.

They are sometimes provided by local civic groups, the faith community and other community organizations. A regular sitter-companion can provide friendly respite care for a few hours, once or twice a week. Care must be taken to assure that the sitter-companion is trained in what to do if an emergency occurs while the regular care-giver is out of the home.

Therapeutic adult daycare
Therapeutic adult daycare may provide respite care during business hours five days a week. However, in some instances, this care may also be provided 24 hours a day. Usually, these are facilities for designated clients only, and not related to family support services other than any specialized service is considered a family support to the family which desires it. However, this group is involved in also trying to reinstitutionalize children which they also term a support to the parents as do the parents involved.

Respite care charities in the UK 
The Respite Association provides short-term assistance in the funding of appropriately qualified respite care for disabled, sick, elderly or terminally ill persons, such that their regular carer can be afforded a break. Other charities with similar aims include Revitalise.org and CareForCarers. Some individual charities, such as the Alzheimer's Association, also offer respite assistance for affected members.

See also
 Caregiver burden
 Caregiver stress
 Respite care in the United States

References

Nursing
Types of health care facilities